In order to view a signal (taken to be a function of time) represented over both time and frequency axis, time–frequency representation is used. Spectrogram is one of the most popular time-frequency representation, and generalized spectrogram, also called "two-window spectrogram", is the generalized application of spectrogram.

Definition
The definition of the spectrogram relies on the Gabor transform (also called short-time Fourier transform, for short STFT), whose idea is to localize a signal  in time by multiplying it with translations of a window function .

The definition of spectrogram is
,

Based on the spectrogram, the generalized spectrogram is defined as:
,
where:

For , it reduces to the classical spectrogram:

Since the time-frequency resolution will be affected by the window size, if one choose a wide  and a narrow  (or the opposite), the resolutions of them will be high in different part of spectrogram. After the multiplication of these two Gabor transform, the resolutions of both time and frequency axis will be enhanced.

Properties
Relation with Wigner Distribution

where 
Time marginal condition
The generalized spectrogram  satisfies the time marginal condition if and only if ,
where  denotes the Dirac delta function
Frequency marginal condition
The generalized spectrogram  satisfies the frequency marginal condition if and only if ,
where  denotes the Dirac delta function
Conservation of energy
The generalized spectrogram  satisfies the conservation of energy if and only if .
Reality analysis

References

 Class notes of Time frequency analysis and wavelet transform --  from Prof. Jian-Jiun Ding's course website 
 P. Boggiatto, G. De Donno, and A. Oliaro, “Two window spectrogram and their integrals," Advances and Applications, vol. 205, pp. 251–268, 2009.

Time–frequency analysis